Valad Kosh (also Romanized as Valad Kosht) is a village in Kashkan Rural District, Shahivand District, Dowreh County, Lorestan Province, Iran. At the 2006 census, its population was 310, in 67 families.

References 

Towns and villages in Dowreh County